Hydriris chalybitis is a moth in the family Crambidae. It is found in Australia, where it has been recorded from Queensland. It has also been recorded from Taiwan.

Adults have narrow brown wings with a darker streak near the tip of the forewings.

References

Moths described in 1885
Spilomelinae
Moths of Australia
Moths of Taiwan